Frederika Menezes (born 1979/80) is a Goan author, poet and artist. She is best known for her book, Unforgotten, a love story for young adults, published in 2014. Her poem, The Different Normals, is yet to feature in English textbook of the Goa Board of Secondary & Higher Secondary Education (GBSHSE).

Early life and education 
Menezes was born to physicians, Jose Menezes and Angela Fonseca e Menezes and grew up in Altinho, Panjim. She was diagnosed with cerebral palsy when she was one year old, she is a champion for the cause of the differently-abled. Menezes completed her schooling at People's High School, Panjim in 1996.

Career 
Menezes's entry into the world of writing poetry was when she was first encouraged by her teacher, for a class project. It was then that she found her passion in writing poems. 

Menezes's other literary works include The Portrait (a collection of poems, published in 1998), The Pepperns and Wars of the Mind (a fantasy novel, published in 2003) and Stories in Rhyme (which was a book of verse for children, released in 2014). She is also a budding artist. She does her paintings digitally (on a tablet, smartphone or PC), using only one finger. Some of her paintings include The Grieving Madonna, Tourada, Mother Sea and First Kiss.

Awards and recognition 
Menezes was awarded the Yuva Srujan Puraskar Award in Literature in 2016. Her first book received praise from the late Dr. Abdul Kalam, the then President of India. She was also given the opportunity to recite from her book of poems in the Goa Legislative Assembly, in front of him. In 2019, Samraat Club, Panjim, felicitated her at her home on the occasion of International Women's Day. 

Also in 2019, Menezes was invited as a Chief Guest for an art exhibition of the Mouth and Foot Painting Artists Association (MFPA), was chosen by the Election Commission of India to be the "disability voting icon" for North Goa district during the 2019 Indian general election and spoke at TEDxPanaji on optimism, positivity and determination.

References

Living people
Writers from Goa
Poets from Goa
People from North Goa district
Indian poets
Year of birth missing (living people)